Llanada Grande Airport  is a public use airport located near Llanada Grande, Los Lagos, Chile.

See also
List of airports in Chile

References

External links 
 Airport record for Llanada Grande Airport at Landings.com

Airports in Chile
Airports in Los Lagos Region